Toniuolevaiavea Satele Fonoti (born November 26, 1981) is a Samoan-born former player of American college and professional football who was a guard in the National Football League (NFL) for five seasons during the early 2000s.  He played college football for the University of Nebraska, and earned consensus All-American honors.  The San Diego Chargers picked him in the second round of the 2002 NFL Draft, and he played professionally for the Chargers, Minnesota Vikings and Miami Dolphins of the NFL.

Early years
Fonoti was born in American Samoa but partly raised in Apia.  He attended El Camino High School in Oceanside, California, and played high school football for the El Camino Wildcats. He played his last two years of high school for the Kahuku Red Raiders, located on the north shore of Oahu and earned all-state 1st team honors.

College career
Fonoti attended the University of Nebraska in Lincoln, where he played for the Nebraska Cornhuskers football team from 1999 to 2001.  He is only the third freshman in Nebraska team history to earn playing time on the Cornhuskers' offensive line.  He was a first-team All-Big 12 selection in 2000 and 2001, and was recognized as a consensus first-team All-American following his 2001 junior season.  He was also a semifinalist for the Lombardi Award and a finalist for the Outland Trophy.  During his time as a Cornhusker, he set three team records: single-game record 32 pancake blocks vs. Texas Tech (2001); single-season record of 201 pancake blocks (2001); and career record of 379 pancakes.

Professional career

2002 NFL Draft
Projected as a late first round selection, Fonoti was rated as the No. 1 offensive guard available in the 2002 NFL Draft by Sports Illustrated. He was noted for "[obliterating] defenders at the line of scrimmage", and "[keeping] his feet moving in pass protection and anchors, not giving up an inch of ground". He was drafted in the second round with the 39th overall pick.

Miami Dolphins
Fonoti signed with the Miami Dolphins on November 7, 2006.

Atlanta Falcons
Fonoti signed with the Atlanta Falcons as an unrestricted free agent on March 14, 2007, and was released on August 4, 2007.

Carolina Panthers
Fonoti signed with the Carolina Panthers on March 25, 2008, and was released on August 30, 2008.

Detroit Lions
Fonoti signed with the Detroit Lions on May 5, 2009. He was waived on August 11 when the team signed wide receiver Billy McMullen.

Personal life
Fonoti has a brother, Tauala'i, who plays football at Stanford and another younger brother, La'auli, who plays football at New Mexico State University. His sister, Dionne Fonoti, is a lecturer at the National University of Samoa.

In September 2022 he was inducted into the Nebraska Football Hall of Fame.

References

External links
 Nebraska Cornhuskers bio

1981 births
Living people
People from Oahu
American sportspeople of Samoan descent
All-American college football players
American football offensive tackles
American football offensive guards
Atlanta Falcons players
Carolina Panthers players
Detroit Lions players
Miami Dolphins players
Minnesota Vikings players
Nebraska Cornhuskers football players
San Diego Chargers players
Tampa Bay Buccaneers players
Sportspeople from Oceanside, California
Players of American football from American Samoa
Players of American football from Hawaii
Players of American football from California